Cedar hemlock douglas-fir forest is a vegetation association in California, United States. This is one of the Kuchler system forest types used to classify California plant communities. As the name implies, dominant tree types are Incense cedar, Western Hemlock and Douglas fir. The forest type is classified FRES20 in the Kuchler system. Understory flora associates include Toyon and Western poison oak.

See also

 California oak woodland
 Mixed conifer forest

References

Further reading
 Bonnie Harper-Lore, Maggie Wilson (2000) Roadside Use of Native Plants, United States Office of Natural Environment. Water and Ecosystems Team, Published by Island Press, 665 pp  
 William C. Fischer, Melanie Miller, Cameron M. Johnston, Jane K. Smith (1996) Fire Effects Information System: User's Guide, DIANE Publishing, 131 pp  
 C.Michael Hogan (2008) "Western poison-oak: Toxicodendron diversilobum", GlobalTwitcher, ed. Nicklas Strömberg

Forests of California
Temperate coniferous forests of the United States
Plant communities of California
 
Plants by habitat